Hairareb is a 2019 Namibian drama film directed by Oshoveli Shipoh on his directorial debut. The film stars David Ndjavera and Claudine de Groot in the lead roles. The plot of the film is loosely based on a novel with the same title written by August C. Bikeur and the titular role was played by the lead actor David Ndjavera. The film was released on 30 August 2019. Prior to the release of the film, it was regarded as one of the most anticipated Namibian films of 2019. It received critical acclaim from the critics for its narrative, direction and cinematography.

Production 
The project was announced by newcomer Oshoveli Shipoh as his maiden directorial venture and the principal photography commenced in October 2018 and went on floors continuously until January 2019. The official teaser was unveiled in October 2018. The portions of the film were mostly shot and set in Okarundu and in Otjimbingwe. The film is produced by production studio Ndapunikwa Investments in association with the Namibia Film Commission. The official trailer of the film was unveiled on 1 March 2019.

Cast 

 David Ndjavera as Hairareb
 Claudine de Groot as Ininis (Hairareb's bride)
 Hazel Hinda as Moira (Hairareb's assistant)

Synopsis 
The plot follows a flashback storyline where a boy finds a diary in the past and begins to read it, revealing the life of his father and his hidden truths.

Plot 
Hairareb (David Ndjavera), a wealthy farmer fighting hard to stay afloat in the terrible drought, then marries a young attractive beautiful lady Ininis (Claudine de Groot) with hidden motives. When he marries her, he struggles to talk to her independently. The relationship between them slowly starts to break up due to their personality differences.

Nominations 
The film received seven nominations at the 2019 Namibia Theatre and Film Awards (NTFA).

References 

2019 films
2019 drama films
Namibian drama films
Films shot in Namibia
Films based on novels
2019 directorial debut films
2010s English-language films